Ömer Ünver (born 26 July 1981 in Afyon, Turkey) is a Turkish professional basketball player for Beşiktaş Cola Turka and has great 3pt-shooting skills. He won the 3pt-Shootout in the Allstar Weekend 2008.

External links
TBLStat.net Profile

1981 births
Living people
Beşiktaş men's basketball players
Turkish men's basketball players
Small forwards